Szentlőrinc is a district in central-western part of Baranya County, Hungary. Szentlőrinc is also the name of the town where the district seat is found. The district is located in the Southern Transdanubia Statistical Region.

Geography 
Szentlőrinc District borders with Hegyhát District to the north, Pécs District to the east, Sellye District to the south, Szigetvár District to the west. The number of the inhabited places in Szentlőrinc District is 21.

Municipalities 
The district has 1 town and 20 villages.
(ordered by population, as of 1 January 2012)

The bolded municipality is city.

See also
List of cities and towns in Hungary

References

External links
 Postal codes of the Szentlőrinc District

Districts in Baranya County